Flow cups are designed to accurately measure the viscosity of paints, inks, varnishes and similar products.

The process of flow through an orifice can often be used as a relative measurement and classification of viscosity.

This measured kinematic viscosity is generally expressed in seconds of flow time which can be converted into centistokes (cSt) using a viscosity calculator.

Flow cups are manufactured using high grade aluminium alloy with stainless steel orifices (where indicated), flow cups are available with a range of UKAS / ISO 17025 certified standard oils to confirm the flow cup is measuring within specification.

See also
 Flow measurement
 Viscometer
 Zahn cup
 Ford cup

Notes and references

References

Fluid dynamics
Viscosity meters